Juraj Bartusz (born 23 October 1933) is a Slovak sculptor known for his time-space statues and for his non-conventional approach to statue and object from the mid-1960s until the present. "In 1972 he started to work with the computer, cooperating with the computer programmer Vladimír Haltenberger. Computer generated curves were used as a template for manufacturing rotational, human-like sculptures." "The broad spectrum of author’s work includes constructivist sculpture, action and conceptual art, site-specific art, as well as installation. In the eighties he started working with the time factor and began to create time-limited paintings and drawings, and model his works by forceful hits, e. g. throwing bricks to solidifying plaster or slamming the material with planks or rubber straps, referring to the energy of the author’s gesture."

Biography
During the 1960s, he was a part of the Club of Concretists (Klub Konkretistov known as Concrete art), led by art historian Arsen Pohribny. Juraj Bartusz was the husband of woman sculptor Mária Bartuszová (between 1961 – 1984). His current wife is poet Jana Bodnárová. He was a professor of Arts at the Academy of Fine Arts and Design in Bratislava (1990-1999); later he established and he is academically active at the Art and Intermedia Department of the Technical University in Košice (since 1999). In 1992 he was appointed to the professorship at the Academy of Fine Arts, Prague (Czech Republic).

Public  collections, selection  
 Slovak National Gallery in Bratislava, Slovak Republic
 East Slovak Gallery, Košice, Slovak Republic
 Albertina, Vienna, Austria
 Museum of Fine Arts (Budapest), Hungary
 House of Arts Olomouc, Czech Republic
 Villa Merkel / Galerien der Stadt Esslingen am Neckar, Germany
 Nitra Gallery, Nitra, Slovak Republic
 L. Kassák Museum, Nové Zámky, Slovak Republic
 The Art Gallery of Považie, Žilina

References

Bibliography 
 BARTOšOVÁ, Zuzana. Juraj Bartusz. In. Výtvarný život 30, 1985, č. 8, s. 24 – 26
 POHRIBNÝ, Arsén. Under The Sign of Principles of Constructivism. Concretist´s Club after 20 Years I. In.: Výtvarný život 36, 1992, č. 2-3, s. 2-14
 Col. 60´s, Slovak National Gallery : Bratislava, 1995
 BAJCUROVÁ, Katarína. Geometric Tendencies In Slovak Sculpture. In.: Changing of Statue 1960 – 199. International Colloquium. Bratislava, 1994, s. 26- 33
 BÜNGEROVÁ, Vladimíra, Katarína BAJCUROVÁ and Lucia GREGOROVÁ-STACHOVÁ. Bartusz: Gesture, Points, Seconds. Bratislava: Slovak National Gallery, 2010. .
 RUSINOVÁ, Zora.  "Juraj Bartusz", in Umenie akcie 1965-1989, ed. Zora Rusinová, Bratislava: Slovenská národná galéria, 2001, pp 131-138. (online Slovak)
 VRBANOVÁ, Alena: Slovak Alternative Graphics. Untraditional, Experimental and Author's Sides of Slovak Graphic During 2nd Half Of 20th Century. Bratislava : Roman Fecik Gallery, 2019

Further reading
Maria Bartuszová. Provisional Forms 

20th-century artists
Slovak artists
Slovak sculptors
20th-century sculptors
1933 births

Living people